Houses of the Molé is the ninth studio album by American industrial metal band Ministry, released on June 21, 2004 by Sanctuary Records. It is noteworthy for being the first Ministry album not to feature bassist and longtime collaborator Paul Barker since Twitch (1986). It was also the first album to feature Mike Scaccia on guitar since 1996's Filth Pig.

Overview
The album is the first part of the band's anti-Bush trilogy, followed by Rio Grande Blood (2006) and The Last Sucker (2007). It was released in the run up to the 2004 American presidential elections, in the last few months of Bush's first term as president. Nearly all songs start with the letter "W" in their title, except for "No W" and the hidden track "Psalm 23". The first track on the album, "No W", features numerous satirical samples of Bush's speeches, particularly samples in which he spoke of his war on terror. Compared to its subsequent follow-ups, the musical style of the album is more thrash metal-oriented.

Jourgensen describes Houses of the Molé as a "rebirth" album as he started Ministry anew without long time collaborator Paul Barker who left after the Animositisomina tour due to a falling-out. In his autobiography, Jourgensen describes that he wrote "Walrus" as a way to "celebrate" Barker's departure. In it, it has the words "Paul is no longer with us" played backwards on repeat.

Jourgensen has stated that the name Houses of the Molé is a tribute to Led Zeppelin's 1973 album Houses of the Holy. Mole itself is a Mexican sauce made from chocolate that is nearly black in color, an image that Jourgensen believes represents crude oil.

Former Ministry drummer Rey Washam stated in an interview that he worked on Houses of the Molé, for which he received no credit, and also stated that Ministry had problems properly compensating all of the musicians who contributed to their records. He also referred to "someone" in Ministry as being a "liar" and "full of shit", and disputed the statement and common belief that Al Jourgensen was solely responsible for writing almost all of Ministry's material. He also said "Houses of the Molé" was "the worst [album] title in the world".

This was the first Ministry studio album to not chart on the Billboard 200. Due to slow sales, the band left Sanctuary.

Reception

In 2005, Houses of the Molé was ranked No. 434 in Rock Hard magazine's book of The 500 Greatest Rock & Metal Albums of All Time.

Track listing

The original release of Houses of the Molé featured "Psalm 23", an alternate version of "No W".  Later releases feature a Redux version of "No W" (with the "O Fortuna" samples removed), dropped "Psalm 23", and added another (hidden) track titled "Bloodlines".  "Walrus" is hidden track on track 69, just like their song "Everybody" on their 1999 album Dark Side of the Spoon.  Every other track on the CD editions of the album consists of five seconds of silence.

Personnel

Ministry
 Alien Jourgensen – vocals, guitars (1–4, 8, 9), bass (1, 7, 8), programming, slide guitar (5), harmonica (9), production
 Mike Scaccia – lead guitar (1–3, 8), guitars, bass (2, 6, 9), background vocals (5, 9)
 John Monte – bass (3–5), background vocals (5)
 Mark Baker – drums (3–5), percussion (3), background vocals (5)

Additional personnel
 Max Brody – programming (2, 6, 7, 9), drums (8), saxophone (9), background vocals (9)
 Angie Jourgensen – background vocals (5, 9)
 Odin Myers – background vocals (5)
 Carl Wayne – background vocals (5)
 Kol Marshall – B3 organ (8, 9)
 Turner Vanblarcum – DJ voice (8)
 Lawton Outlaw – original cover, inside tray art, art direction, design
 Paul Elledge – photography
 Rey Washam – drums (uncredited)

Chart positions

References

Bibliography

External links 

2004 albums
Albums produced by Al Jourgensen
Ministry (band) albums
Sanctuary Records albums
Albums recorded at Sonic Ranch
Cultural depictions of George W. Bush